Rista Stoop (born 7 October 1970) is a South African former cricketer who played as a right-arm medium bowler and right-handed batter. She appeared in four One Day Internationals for South Africa in 1997, all on their tour of Ireland and England. She played domestic cricket for KwaZulu-Natal.

References

External links
 
 

1970 births
Living people
Cricketers from Pietermaritzburg
South African women cricketers
South Africa women One Day International cricketers
KwaZulu-Natal Coastal women cricketers